Sukhamoy Chakravarty (26 July 1934 – 22 August 1990) was an Indian economist who, along with Prasanta Chandra Mahalanobis, was a key architect of the Five-Year plans of India. He attended Ballygunge Government High School, Calcutta and Presidency College, Kolkata when it was under University of Calcutta as an Economics major, where he was a batchmate of Amartya Sen. He later attended the Delhi School of Economics
and obtained a doctorate from Erasmus University Rotterdam under Jan Tinbergen. He assumed a teaching post at Massachusetts Institute of Technology but returned to India to join the Planning Commission. He was a professor of economics at the Delhi School of Economics.

Sukhamoy was a highly creative and prodigious scholar, and a voracious reader. He was one of the most outstanding Indian economists of the 20th century with rare social awareness and commitment. His initial interest in high theory and mathematical economics gave way to practical policy analysis of issues relating to the under-privileged. He had put his phenomenal scholarship to continued application in the study of development issues. He left an indelible impression on the intellectual world. Samuelson and Tinbergen were Chakravarty's life-long admirers. When Chakravarty died his teacher Tinbergen remarked that he had learned more from Chakravarty than Chakravarty learning from him.

References

1934 births
1990 deaths
20th-century Indian economists
Fellows of the Econometric Society